James Carroll Robinson (August 19, 1823 – November 3, 1886) was a U.S. Representative from Illinois.

Born near Paris, Illinois, Robinson moved to Clark County, Illinois, with his parents in 1825.
He received a limited schooling.
He engaged in agricultural pursuits.
He served as a corporal during the Mexican War. He studied law. He was admitted to the bar in 1850 and commenced practice in Marshall, Illinois.

Robinson was elected as a Democrat to the Thirty-sixth, Thirty-seventh, and Thirty-eighth Congresses (March 4, 1859 – March 3, 1865).  His vote on the Thirteenth Amendment is recorded as nay.
He did not seek renomination in 1864, but was an unsuccessful candidate for Governor of Illinois.
He resumed the practice of law in Marshall.
He moved to Sangamon County, Illinois, in 1869 and continued the practice of law in Springfield.

Robinson was elected to the Forty-second and Forty-third Congresses (March 4, 1871 – March 3, 1875).
He served as chairman of the Committee on Mileage (Thirty-seventh and Thirty-eighth Congresses).
He declined to be a candidate for renomination in 1874 to the Forty-fourth Congress.
He resumed the practice of law.
He was appointed a member of the Illinois Board of Livestock Commissioners in 1886.
He died in Springfield, Illinois, on November 3, 1886, and was interred in Oak Ridge Cemetery.

References

1823 births
1886 deaths
People from Marshall, Illinois
United States Army soldiers
Democratic Party members of the United States House of Representatives from Illinois
19th-century American politicians